Huang Xiyang (born June 14, 1985) is a Chinese professional footballer who plays as a midfielder for Chinese Super League club Chongqing Lifan.

Club career
Huang was the product of the Chongqing Lifan youth team and would start his professional football career with Chongqing Lifan in the 2005 league season, where he quickly established himself as a regular. This was soon followed by his first professional goal on 18 May 2005 when he scored his against Sichuan Guancheng in the first round of the Super League Cup in a 5-1 victory. After six seasons with Chongqing Lifan, Huang was a loyal member of the team as they experienced relegation and promotion back into the Chinese Super League until on December 8, 2010 he decided to transfer to top tier club Henan Construction.

At Henan, Huang would immediately establish himself as a regular within the team, however he would once again experience relegation at the end of the 2012 league season. After only one season he would help guide Henan to the division title and immediate promotion back into the Chinese Super League. In the following season Henan would be in a fight to avoid relegation, however despite being a vital member of the team, Huang was suspended from the team and he returned to his hometown of Chongqing after having a disagreement the Head coach Jia Xiuquan's tactics and his contract renewal. On 25 December 2014, Huang transferred to Chinese Super League side Hangzhou Greentown. He transferred to China League One side Wuhan Zall on 14 January 2017.

He made his return to Chongqing Dangdai on 24 June, 2020.

Career statistics
Statistics accurate as of match played 31 December 2020.

Honours

Club
Henan Jianye
China League One: 2013

Wuhan Zall
China League One: 2018

References

External links
Player stats at sohu.com
 

1985 births
Living people
Chinese footballers
Footballers from Chongqing
Chongqing Liangjiang Athletic F.C. players
Henan Songshan Longmen F.C. players
Zhejiang Professional F.C. players
Wuhan F.C. players
Chinese Super League players
China League One players
Association football midfielders